Carl-Ludwig Christinek (1730/1732–c.1794) was a Russian painter.

Christinek was born to German parents and was initially taught in German, but lived his whole life in Russia. He painted primarily portraits of Russian aristocracy.  He settled down in St. Petersburg, where he died, c.1794. Among some of his notable works was a mosaic of the Battle of Poltava, produced at the Imperial Porcelain Factory, Saint Petersburg. In 1785, he did a portrait of the architect Yury Felten.

Portrait gallery

References

1732 births
1792 deaths
18th-century painters from the Russian Empire
Russian male painters
Russian people of German descent